Future Records was a music imprint, based in London, England. It was founded in 2009. The label was closed in 2012.

History
In 2009, it was announced that Gary Barlow had been given his own music label, Future, by Universal as a reward for masterminding Take That's comeback and subsequent renewed success. Barlow stated that by creating his own label he would be able to provide an insight and first-hand experience of the music industry, and help new and exciting young talent emerge to build the future of the music industry.

Barlow's first signing was Camilla Kerslake. With Barlow's guidance her debut album entered the UK classical charts at number 4.

Barlow's second signing was Aggro Santos and two months later his debut single "Candy" charted at number 5 in the UK Singles Chart. His second single has since charted at number 19 in the UK singles chart and number 7 in the UK R&B Chart.

Barlow also signed Emma's Imagination, winner of the unsigned talent show Must Be The Music, to Future. She hit number 7 and number 10 in the UK Singles Chart with "Focus" and "This Day" respectively. Londoners Lonsdale Boys Club are the latest signing to Future, with an album scheduled for release in early 2012.

On 29 December 2012, Barlow announced the closure of Future Records so he could spend more time with his family. All artists signed to the label will be passed to the parent company Universal, and continue their current recording contracts.

Label artists
 A*M*E
 Aggro Santos (2012)
 Camilla Kerslake (2010-2012)
 Delta Maid
 Emma's Imagination (2010-2012)
 Lonsdale Boys Club (2010-2012)
 The Struts

Discography

Singles
Aggro Santos

Emma's Imagination

Albums
Camilla Kerslake

Emma's Imagination

References

Record labels established in 2009
British record labels
Pop record labels